RBO or Rbo may refer to:
Rock et Belles Oreilles, a Québécois radio, television and stage comedy group
MTA Regional Bus Operations, the surface transit division of New York's Metropolitan Transportation Authority
Ragnarok Battle Offline, a computer game
Reliability-based optimization, a Multidisciplinary design optimization method 
Rubidium oxide, the chemical compound Rb2O
Robert Brownlee Observatory in Lake Arrowhead, California
Rule Based Optimization, an SQL Query plan optimization technique
Red Buttes Observatory near Laramie, Wyoming
Rang Badalti Odhani
Rank-biased overlap used in Ranking information